Rushes is the second album by the Fireman, released in 1998.

The title, when combined with the band name, references a lyric from the McCartney-penned Beatles song "Penny Lane":
"And then the fireman rushes in / From the pouring rain / Very strange."

Recording
One line of lyrics included in the song "Palo Verde" was taken from an unreleased track of McCartney's, titled "Let Me Love You Always". Similarly, bits from another unreleased song, "Hey Now (What Are You Looking at Me For?)", was used in "Bison", "Auraveda" and "7 a.m.". Both unreleased tracks were recorded at some point during 1995, at McCartney's The Mill studio. In an edition of Club Sandwich magazine, two more songs were mentioned: "Plum Jam" and "Through the Marshes". All of the tracks featured on the album were recorded in February 1998. Youth later referred to this album as his proudest of the Fireman albums. ""We recorded the album when Linda was going through the final stages of her cancer," he recalled in 2018. "She was very involved with the project again. It was very sad when she died. When I listen to the album now, it sounds like a requiem for her, it’s very beautiful."

Release and reception

Better received than predecessor Strawberries Oceans Ships Forest, Rushes is distinguished by not relying  on McCartney's previously released recordings. To promote the album McCartney helded a 70 minutes webcast on 2 October 1998. He performed live on guitar, bass and keyboards to the Rushes basic tracks, while a woman was answering the questions submitted by the users. McCartney appeared in disguise during the whole show and he never spoke.

Rushes was released in the UK on Hydra on 21 September 1998, while in the US it was released on 20 October 1998. The album was also released on double vinyl. Two 12" singles were released from the album, both mixes of "Fluid". The first 12", released on the same day as and with the same name as the album, contains the tracks "Fluid", "Appletree Cinnabar Amber", and an extended version of an album track titled "Bison (Long One)". The second 12" was released in 1999, as a limited edition of 3000, titled Fluid (Nitin Sawhney Remixes), and features three remixes of "Fluid" ("Fluid (Out of Body and Mind Mix)", "Fluid (Out of Body Mix)" and "Fluid (Out of Body with Sitar Mix)") and the album version of "Bison". Like the duo's first album, Rushes was a no-show on the charts and is also no longer in print.

Track listing
All songs written by the Fireman.

Side A
"Watercolour Guitars" – 5:48
"Palo Verde" – 11:56
Side B
"Auraveda" – 12:51
Side C
"Fluid" – 11:19
"Appletree Cinnabar Amber" – 7:12
Side D
"Bison" – 2:40
"7 a.m." – 7:49
"Watercolour Rush" – 1:45

Personnel
 Paul McCartney – all instruments and vocals

References
 Footnotes

 Citations

The Fireman (band) albums
1998 albums
Albums produced by Paul McCartney
Albums produced by Youth (musician)